Jean Jourden (born 11 July 1942) is a retired French cyclist. As an amateur he won the road race at the 1961 UCI Road World Championships. In 1965 he turned professional and competed until 1972. He won several minor races and rode the Tour de France in 1968 and 1969. His brother Henri was also a cyclist.

References 

1942 births
Living people
French male cyclists